Devji Mansingram Patel (born 25 September 1976) is a member of the Lok Sabha, which is the lower house of parliament of India. He was elected in 2009 from Jalore (Lok Sabha constituency) in Rajasthan as a candidate of the Bharatiya Janata Party. He again won the elections in 2014 general elections and got elected for the third time in 2019 general elections. He was born in a village called Jajusan near Sanchore to a farmer father. He established a steel trading business in Mumbai under the name "Divine Tubes Pvt Ltd", the name attached to his various establishments like schools (Divine International) and other businesses.
He is from Sanchore, Jalore (Rajasthan) and currently resides in Ahmedabad, Gujarat.

As Member of Parliament
He is a member of the standing committee on Coal and Steel. He has also introduced 9 private members bills in the 16th loksabaha.
He is Candidate for 17th Loksabha.

References

India MPs 2009–2014
India MPs 2019–present
Living people
People from Jalore district
Lok Sabha members from Rajasthan
India MPs 2014–2019
Bharatiya Janata Party politicians from Rajasthan
1976 births